This article refers to the events that occurred in the state of São Paulo during the COVID-19 pandemic in Brazil in the first half of 2020. The city of São Paulo registered the first case of the pandemic in Brazil, a 61-year-old man who had returned from Italy and tested positive for the coronavirus of severe acute respiratory syndrome 2 (SARS-CoV-2).

Chronology

Research and laboratory diagnosis

In the city of São Paulo, field hospitals for the exclusive care of people with COVID-19 were built by the municipal and state governments. Hospitals were established at Pacaembu Stadium, at the Ibirapuera Gymnasium athletics track and the Anhembi Convention Center.

Statistics

Evolution of the number of cases and deaths
The graphs below show the growth of cases and deaths in the state. On new case and death charts, the bars represent the actual number of notifications per day, while the line is a seven-day moving average to help smooth out anomalies between days and reveal the overall trend. The data are from the Ministry of Health (MH).

By municipality:
This is the list of municipalities with the most confirmed cases, out of a total of 584 municipalities with at least one case, by June 17, 2020:

See also

 COVID-19 pandemic
 COVID-19 pandemic in South America
 COVID-19 pandemic in Brazil

References

External links
 

 
Sao Paulo
Health in São Paulo (state)
History of São Paulo (state)